"Monodrama" (Chinese: 独角戏; Korean: 모노드라마) is a single recorded by Chinese singer Lay. It was released on May 27, 2016, by S.M. Entertainment through SM Station.

Background and release 
Produced by Lay and Devine Channel, Monodrama is described as "R&B" song with a detailed acoustic guitar and soft piano melody with lyrics that express the emotions of a man feeling the pain of an unrequited love. "Monodrama" is SM STATION's first Chinese language song. It was released officially on May 27, 2016.

Music video 
The music video of "Monodrama" was officially released on May 27, 2016.

Live performance 
Lay performed "Monodrama" live on Exo Planet 3 – The Exo'rdium concerts. Lay subsequently performed the song at Star Show 360, a variety show on MBC Every 1.

Track listing

Reception 
Upon release, "Monodrama" music video was ranked #1 on VCharts China, iTunes Singapore, Hong Kong, Taiwan, Thailand, Malaysia, Vietnam and Japan. It ranked #2 in the Philippines and USA and #3 in Indonesia. "Monodrama" ranked #1 on Billboard's China V Chart for consecutively five weeks. The music video has broken the record on Charts in just two days, where it gained 1,968,909 views in 48 hours. The song ranked #4 on YinYueTai's TOP 100 Songs of 2016 (China) V Chart. "Monodrama" also ranked #2 on Alibaba Year-End Top 40 Music Chart for 2016. It ranked No.7 on Xiami's Top 100 Most Popular Singles of 2016 in China.

Charts

Release history

References 

2016 songs
2016 singles
Chinese-language songs
SM Entertainment singles
Lay Zhang songs